Behavioral ecology is the study of the evolutionary basis for animal behavior due to ecological pressures.

Behavioral ecology may also refer to:

 Behavioral Ecology (journal), a scientific journal
 Behavioral Ecology and Sociobiology journal
 Human behavioral ecology